Johnson Newlon Camden (March 6, 1828 – April 25, 1908) was a prominent oilman, industrialist, banker, railroad tycoon, and politician who was estimated to have $25 million at the time of his unexpected death. Although both of his attempts to become governor of the new state of West Virginia failed, he did become United States Senator, representing West Virginia on two occasions.

Early and family life
Born in 1828 in Collins Settlement, the county seat of Lewis County, Virginia (now West Virginia), to Col. John Scrivener Camden (1798–1862; who would serve in the Virginia House of Delegates from 1845-1846) and his wife, the former Nancy Newlon, Johnson Newlon Camden was the grandson of Rev. Henry Benjamin Camden, who freed his slaves in Maryland in 1804 and moved west to what became Harrison County, West Virginia during the American Civil War and this Johnson Camden's lifetime. His siblings included CSA Lt. Col. Edwin Duncan Camden (1840–1922) of the 25th Virginia Infantry, William D. Camden (1842–1878), Amanda McKinley, Lorenzo Dow Camden (1844–1910) and John Scrivener Camden Jr. (1851–1923). His uncle, Judge Gideon D. Camden of Harrison County, resigned his judicial position as the Civil War began and declined to become a delegate to the Confederate States congress and later a became West Virginia state senator.

Johnson N. Camden attended school in Sutton and at age 14 apprenticed with his uncle, the county clerk in Weston. In 1846, he won an appointment as a cadet to the United States Military Academy at West Point while his father represented Braxton, Lewis and Gilmer Counties in the Virginia House of Delegates for a single term (1845–46). Young J. N. Camden studied for two years but resigned in 1848, to read law in his home state.

On June 22, 1858, in Wheeling, Johnson N. Camden married Anne Thompson (1834–1918), daughter of prominent lawyer George W. Thompson, who had become a U.S. Congressman and was then a prominent local judge. They would have children Johnson N. Camden Jr. (1865–1942) and Annie Camden Spilman (1862–1958), although their son George died as an infant.

Law and politics 
Camden was admitted to the Virginia bar and began his practice in Sutton, the Braxton County seat in 1851. Although his father continued to live in Lewis county, his brothers Edwin, William and Lorenzo had moved to Braxton County. Young Johnson N. Camden was appointed the same year as Braxton County's prosecuting attorney. In 1852 J. N. Camden won election as prosecuting attorney for Nicholas County.

In 1858, Camden moved to Parkersburg, on the Ohio River. There he began investing in land. The following year, he moved to Burning Springs, site of an oil boom in 1860 which made him rich. Camden became involved in oil refining, coal manufacture and sold part of his interest for $100,000. He joined with his brother in law became a wealthy industrialist, selling their oil interests for $410,000 in 1866, and investing the proceeds in several new industries. Camden Consolidated Oil Company was ultimately acquired by Standard Oil. Camden also consolidated several small railroads, which helped transport great quantities of coal.

Camden sympathized with the Union and did not serve in either army during the American Civil War, although CSA General Stonewall Jackson had been raised nearby. His father died in Weston in 1862. His younger brother Edwin Duncan Camden became Lt.Col. of the 25th Virginia Infantry, and after capture became one of the Immortal 600 (hostages used by the Union as human shields in South Carolina a retaliation for Confederate treatment of Union prisoners of war).

Camden became president of the First National Bank of Parkersburg at its organization in 1862, and was an unsuccessful Democratic candidate for Governor of West Virginia in 1868 and again in 1872.

Voters finally elected Camden as a Democrat to the U.S. Senate, where he served one term, from March 4, 1881, to March 4, 1887. He then resumed the practice of law at Parkersburg. Upon the death in office of U.S. Senator John E. Kenna, Camden won the election and served the remainder of that term, from January 25, 1893, to March 3, 1895, then retired from elective politics. While in the Senate, Camden was chairman of the Committee to Audit and Control the Contingent Expense (Fifty-third Congress) and a member of the Committee on Railroads (Fifty-third Congress). He continued his former business  and civic pursuits.

Death and legacy
Camden died in Baltimore, Maryland, en route back to Weston, West Virginia, after visiting family. His body was returned to Parkersburg for burial in Parkersburg Memorial Gardens with his infant son, and where his widow would join him a decade later. His son, Johnson N. Camden Jr., was a U.S. Senator from Kentucky in the 63rd Congress.

In 1903–04, Camden built the Union Trust & Deposit Co./Union Trust National Bank at Parkersburg.  It was listed on the National Register of Historic Places in 1982.  Camden also owned lumber and hotel interests in Lanes Bottom, West Virginia (now known as Camden-on-Gauley).

External Links
 The West Virginia & Regional History Center at West Virginia University houses the papers of Johnson N. Camden in A&M 7, A&M 339, and A&M 1228

References

1828 births
1908 deaths
19th-century American lawyers
20th-century American lawyers
American bank presidents
Businesspeople from West Virginia
County prosecuting attorneys in West Virginia
Democratic Party United States senators from West Virginia
People from Sutton, West Virginia
People from Lewis County, West Virginia
People from Nicholas County, West Virginia
Politicians from Parkersburg, West Virginia
United States Military Academy alumni
Virginia lawyers
West Virginia Democrats
West Virginia lawyers
19th-century American politicians
19th-century American businesspeople